Gray matter heterotopias are neurological disorders caused by clumps of gray matter (nodules of neurons) located in the wrong part of the brain. A grey matter heterotopia is characterized as a type of focal cortical dysplasia.  The neurons in heterotopia appear to be normal, except for their mislocation; nuclear studies have shown glucose metabolism equal to that of normally positioned gray matter. The condition causes a variety of symptoms, but usually includes some degree of epilepsy or recurring seizures, and often affects the brain's ability to function on higher levels.  Symptoms range from nonexistent to profound; the condition is occasionally discovered as an incidentaloma when brain imaging performed for an unrelated problem and has no apparent ill effect on the patient.  At the other extreme, heterotopia can result in severe seizure disorder, loss of motor skills, and mental retardation.  Fatalities are practically unknown, other than the death of unborn male fetuses with a specific genetic defect.

Background

The development of the brain in the human fetus is extraordinarily complex and is still not fully understood.  Neural matter originates in the outer, ectodermic layer of the gastrula;  thus, it originates from the cell layer primarily responsible for skin, hair, nails, etc., rather than from the layers that develop into other internal organs.  The nervous system originates as a tiny, simple open tube called the neural tube;  the front of this tube develops into the brain (and retinas of the eye), while the spinal cord develops from the very back end.

Neurons begin to form early, but most of them become structural rather than active nerve cells.  The brain generally forms from the inside-out, especially in the case of the neocortex.  The difficulties arising from this are readily apparent, as each successive layer of cells must travel through the previous layer to reach its destination.  Therefore, nervous tissue develops ladders made of radial glial cells that neurons climb, through the previous layers, to reach their proper destination. Some destinations, such as the cerebral cortex, even have "placeholder" neurons that travel up the ladder to form a structure;  when the final neurons germinate, they find a correct placeholder and then the placeholder cell dies.

The complexity of neural development makes it fraught with opportunities for error.  Grey matter heterotopia is such an example.  It is believed that gray matter heterotopia are caused by arrested migration of neurons to the cerebral cortex; that is, when neurons that are supposed to form part of the cerebral cortex. fail to climb to the end of their ladder correctly and are permanently situated in the wrong location.

Types 
Gray matter heterotopia are common malformations of cortical development classed as neuronal migration disorders. Heterotopias are classed in two groups: nodular and diffuse. Nodular types are subependymal and subcortical; diffuse types are termed band heterotopias. Affected patients are generally divided into three groups, depending on the location of the formation: subependymal, subcortical, and band heterotopia. In addition, especially with heterotopia that are genetically linked, there are gender differences. Men seem to develop more severe symptoms than women with similar formations.

Band heterotopia, a form of the condition (also known as double cortex syndrome), is seen exclusively in women; men with a mutation of the related gene (called XLIS or DCX) usually die in utero or have a much more severe brain anomaly. Symptoms in affected women vary from normal to severe developmental delay or intellectual disability; the severity of the syndrome is related to the thickness of the band of arrested neurons. Nearly all affected patients that come to medical attention have epilepsy, with partial complex and atypical absence epilepsy being the most common syndromes. Some of the more severely affected patients develop drop attacks.

Periventricular or subependymal
Periventricular means beside the ventricle, while subependymal (also spelled subepydymal) means beneath the ependyma; because the ependyma is the thin epithelial sheet lining the ventricles of the brain, these two terms are used to define heterotopia occurring directly next to a ventricle.  This is by far the most common location for heterotopia. Patients with isolated subependymal heterotopia usually present with a seizure disorder in the second decade of life.

Subependymal heterotopia present in a wide array of variations.  They can be a small single node or a large number of nodes, can exist on either or both sides of the brain at any point along the higher ventricle margins, can be small or large, single or multiple, and can form a small node or a large wavy or curved mass.

Symptomatic women with subependymal heterotopia typically present with partial epilepsy during the second decade of life; development and neurologic examinations up to that point are typically normal. Symptoms in men with subependymal heterotopia vary, depending on whether their disease is linked to their X-chromosome. Men with the X-linked form more commonly have associated anomalies, which can be neurological or more widespread, and they usually suffer from developmental problems. Otherwise (i.e., in non-X-linked cases) the symptomology is similar in both sexes.

Focal subcortical
Subcortical heterotopia form as distinct nodes in the white matter, "focal" indicating specific area.  In general, patients present fixed neurologic deficits and develop partial epilepsy between the ages of 6 and 10.  The more extensive the subcortical heterotopia, the greater the deficit; bilateral heterotopia are almost invariably associated with severe developmental delay or intellectual disability. The cortex itself often has an absence of gray matter and may be unusually thin or lack deep sulci.  Subependymal heterotopia are frequently accompanied by other structural abnormalities, including an overall decrease in cortical mass. Patients with focal subcortical heterotopia have a variable motor and intellectual disturbance depending on the size and site of the heterotopion.

Diagnosis
Detection of heterotopia generally occurs when a patient receives brain imaging—usually an MRI or CT scan—to diagnose seizures that are resistant to medication.  Correct diagnosis requires a high degree of radiological skill, due to the heterotopia's resemblance to other masses in the brain.

Treatment
When seizures are present in any forms of cortical dysplasia, they are resistant to medication.  Frontal lobe resection provides significant relief from seizures to a minority of patients with periventricular lesions.

Prognosis
In general, gray matter heterotopia is fixed in both its occurrence and symptoms;  that is, once symptoms occur, it does not tend to progress.  Varying results from surgical resection of the affected area have been reported.  Although such surgery cannot reverse developmental disabilities, it may provide full or partial relief from seizures.

Heterotopia are most commonly isolated anomalies, but may be part of a number of syndromes, including chromosomal abnormalities and fetal exposure to toxins (including alcohol).

Footnotes

Further reading
  GeneReviews/NCBI/NIH/UW entry on X-Linked Periventricular Heterotopia
 

Central nervous system disorders